Legend of the Three Kingdoms may refer to:

The Legend of Three Kingdoms, Taiwanese video game series
Legends of the Three Kingdoms, Chinese card game